Cyperus trialatus is a species of sedge that is native to south eastern parts of Asia and south western parts of Melanesia.

See also 
 List of Cyperus species

References 

trialatus
Plants described in 1954
Flora of China
Flora of Borneo
Flora of Cambodia
Flora of Java
Flora of Malaysia
Flora of Sumatra
Flora of Thailand
Flora of Vietnam
Taxa named by Johannes Hendrikus Kern